The Nic Diederichs Technical High School slashing was an incident on 17 August 2008 at the Nic Diederichs Technical High School in Krugersdorp, South Africa, in which 18-year-old matric (Grade 12) student Morné Harmse attacked four people with a samurai sword. Sixteen-year-old grade 9 pupil Jacques Pretorius was killed, and two campus gardeners and a second pupil were seriously injured. Harmse later pleaded guilty to a charge of murder and three charges of attempted murder, and was sentenced to twenty years' imprisonment.

Harmse was reported to have "followed" the practice of Satanism. Harmse had acquired a mask that resembled one of a member of the American heavy metal band Slipknot, had donned a dress similar to the band's singer, Corey Taylor , on the morning of the attack, and had been listening to the band for months prior to the attack.

The attack 
At about 7:00 a.m. (SAST), Harmse arrived at school in his school uniform, wearing a brown mask and with black paint on his face. The mask was reported to be an imitation of the one Slipknot lead vocalist Corey Taylor wears, which Harmse had referred to as the "maggot mask" but the media claimed that it resembled Joey Jordison's own mask and not Taylor's. Two other masks were found in Harmse's bag: a clown mask from a Hollywood costume store similar to Shawn Crahan's, and a handmade papier-mâché with drilled holes, painted with tribal marks. Three samurai swords were also found in his bag, which included a Sekizo ninja sword and a small katana.

At about 7:20 a.m., during an assembly for a congregation, Harmse took out his 60-cm samurai sword, and slashed 16-year-old pupil Jacques Pretorius' neck, causing him to die immediately. Harmse walked down a passage and slashed 17-year-old Stefan Bouwer on the head, and was immediately confronted by two school groundskeepers, Joseph Kodiseng and Simon Manamela, who were both slashed and injured. All three were taken to hospital.

Harmse's attack was concluded when he sat down on a brick wall and stuck the sword in the ground, which was grabbed by his younger brother, Corné, who was standing nearby. At about 7:45 a.m., Harmse was escorted to the principal's office, and fifteen minutes later was arrested by police without incident. He was temporarily held in the custody of the Krugersdorp Police Station.

Conviction 
On 20 August 2008, Harmse was charged with one count of murder and three counts of attempted murder at the Krugersdorp Magistrate's Court. He was later sent to the Sterkfontein Psychiatric Hospital for mental health evaluation. On 25 October, after two consecutive months of mental health evaluation and two postponements of the court date, Harmse was ruled to be mentally fit by Magistrate Joachim Nortje.

The case was transferred to the South Gauteng High Court in Johannesburg for trial in front of Judge Gerhardus Hattingh. On 14 April 2009 Harmse pleaded guilty to all four charges, and on 10 October, he was sentenced to twenty years' imprisonment.

Reactions

Blame on Satanism and media 
In the aftermath of the attacks, blame was put on Satanism, which Harmse took an interest in. Harmse claimed that Satan had told him to do it, and that he followed the practice of Satanism. When police executed a search in Harmse's room, they found "disturbing elements of Satanism" that included ouija boards and "spell books."

Heavy metal act Slipknot was also blamed for the attacks as Harmse had obtained masks resembling those of the band members, and was reportedly listening to the band months before.

Slipknot frontman Corey Taylor later issued a response to Harmse's actions:

Apology 
The parents of Morné Harmse, Machiel and Liza Harmse, issued a formal apology to the Pretorius family.

References

External links 
The Times: Morné Harmse in Court (Flash audio clip)

August 2008 crimes
Murder in South Africa
Deaths by blade weapons
Crimes involving Satanism or the occult
2008 murders in South Africa
August 2008 events in South Africa